Ripley Hospital is a health facility in Sandham Lane, Ripley, Derbyshire, England. It is managed by Derbyshire Community Health Services NHS Foundation Trust.

History
The facility was commissioned after the death of a miner injured at Pentrich Colliery, who did not survive the road journey to Derby in time for treatment. It opened as Ripley Cottage Hospital in September 1912 and joined the National Health Service as Ripley Hospital in 1948.

References

Hospital buildings completed in 1912
Hospitals established in 1912
Hospitals in Derbyshire
NHS hospitals in England
1912 establishments in England